Philippe de Bourbon, Duke of Vendôme (1655–1727) was the Grand Prior for France in the Order of Malta. Vendôme held senior military positions throughout his life, in various command roles.

Life 
Philippe was born in 1655, the second son of Louis de Bourbon, duc de Vendôme, and of his wife, Laura Mancini.  Among his earlier military campaigns was the Siege of Candia in 1669, during which he fought against Turkish forces. During the siege, his uncle, François de Vendôme, duc de Beaufort, was killed.

In his later position of Grand Prior for France in the Order of Malta, Philippe was able to attain numerous military commands, fighting in engagements including Fleurus, Steenkirk and Marsaglia.

During the Spanish War of Succession Philippe was briefly in command of French forces in Italy.  The opposing Austrian forces were commanded by Prince Eugene of Savoy, a more skilled commander than Philippe, whose brother Louis Joseph, another senior French commander, had to assist him during the Battle of Cassano.  He was subsequently demoted to a position subordinate to that of his brother, and served in this role during further campaigning occurring in Flanders.

After the death of Louis-Joseph, Philippe inherited his brother's ducal titles (except Duke of Penthièvre which had been sold to Marie Anne de Bourbon in 1696). He died without issue.  The dukedom became extinct after his death.

Ancestry

References

Sources

Les Bourbon-Vendôme

1655 births
1727 deaths
House of Bourbon-Vendôme
Dukes of Vendôme
People of the Ottoman–Venetian Wars
Vendome